Michigan's 37th Senate district is one of 38 districts in the Michigan Senate. The 37th district was created with the adoption of the 1963 Michigan Constitution, as the previous 1908 state constitution only permitted 34 senatorial districts. It has been represented by Republican John Damoose since 2023, succeeding fellow Republican Wayne Schmidt.

Geography
District 38 encompasses the entirety of Antrim, Charlevoix, Cheboygan, Emmet, Grand Traverse, Leelanau, and Presque Isle counties as well as parts of Chippewa and Mackinac counties.

2011 Apportionment Plan
District 37, as dictated by the 2011 Apportionment Plan, covered the northernmost parts of the Lower Peninsula and the eastern end of the Upper Peninsula, including all of Antrim, Charlevoix, Cheboygan, Chippewa, Emmet, Grand Traverse, Luce, and Mackinac Counties. Communities in the district included Traverse City, Sault Ste. Marie, Petoskey, Cheboygan, Boyne City, St. Ignace, Kingsley, Elk Rapids, Charlevoix, East Jordan, Newberry, Garfield Township, East Bay Township, Blair Township, and Long Lake Township.

The district was located entirely within Michigan's 1st congressional district, and overlapped with the 104th, 105th, 106th, 107th, and 109th districts of the Michigan House of Representatives. The district bordered Canada, as well as three Great Lakes: Huron, Michigan, and Superior.

List of senators

Recent election results

2018

2014

Federal and statewide results in District 37

Historical district boundaries

References 

37
Antrim County, Michigan
Charlevoix County, Michigan
Cheboygan County, Michigan
Chippewa County, Michigan
Emmet County, Michigan
Grand Traverse County, Michigan
Luce County, Michigan
Mackinac County, Michigan